Ludwig Becker (19 November 185513 July 1940) was a German architect.

Life
Becker was born the son of the eponymous Cologne master craftsman and master builder. He studied from 1873 at the Technical University of Aachen and was trained in addition to the stonemason and sculptor at the Cologne Dombauhütte. In Mainz he was named church master builder (Kirchenbaumeister) in 1884, and cathedral master builder (Dombaumeister) from 1909 to 1940. After 1909 he partnered with Anton Falkowski, and later with his son, the church architect Hugo Becker (1897–1967).

Becker also worked as a construction researcher at the Mainz Cathedral, who brought important findings to light; however, his conclusions were flawed. His thesis was that the construction of the Mainz Cathedral was already begun in Constantine the Great's time in the 4th century, but he could not convincingly demonstrate the claim, which was unanimously rejected by experts.

Becker's grave is in Mainz's main cemetery.

Work

Becker dealt with over 300 churches, which he restored, rebuilt or rebuilt. He used numerous styles of various historical architectural styles, as is customary in historicism. He designed many buildings together with his business partner Anton Falkowski. Becker and Falkowski preferred Romanesque and Gothic before the First World War, then simple baroque. From about 1930, expressionist stylistic devices were also used.

 Catholic parish Church of the Assumption in Kirrberg, 1881–1893
 Catholic parish Church of St. Mary in Bad Homburg before the height, designed in 1889, executed 1892–1895
 Catholic parish Church of St. Joseph in St. Ingbert, 1890–1893
 Catholic parish Church of St. Martin in Oestrich (restoration), 1890–1893
 Tomb chapel of the family Wambolt of Umstadt in the castle Birkenau (Odenwald), 1891
 Catholic garrison Church St. Mauritius in Strasbourg, Arnoldsplatz, competition 1893, completed 1899
 Catholic parish Church of St. Bartholomew in Zornheim, 1893–1894
 Catholic parish Church of St. Mary's Conception in Düsseldorf, 1894–1896
 Catholic parish Church of the Holy Cross in Bad Kreuznach, Wilhelmstraße, 1895–1897
 Catholic parish Church of St. Rochus in Kaiserslautern-Hohenecken, 1896–1897
 Catholic parish Church of St. Michael in Unter-Hambach (Heppenheim), 1897–1899
 Catholic parish Church of St. Lawrence in Bobenheim, 1898
 Catholic parish Church of St. Matthew in Bad Sobernheim, 1898–1899
 Episcopal Convict in Bensheim, 1899–1900
 Catholic parish Church of the Sacred Heart in Bad Kreuznach-Planig, 1900
 Catholic parish Church of St. Lutwinus in Mettlach, 1899–1902
 Catholic parish Church of St. Agatha in Altenhundem (with ), 1900–1901
 Catholic parish Church of St. Hubertus in Nonnweiler, 1900–1902
 Catholic parish Church of St. Bernard in Clausen, 1900–1903
 Catholic parish Church of the Sacred Heart in Koblenz, Löhrrondell, 1900–1903
 Catholic parish Church of St. Peter in Heppenheim (Bergstraße), Kirchgasse, 1900–1904
 Catholic parish Church of St. Joseph in Hagen, 1901–1906
 Catholic parish Church of St. Fridolin in Mulhouse, 1901–1906
 Catholic parish Church of St. Joseph in Montigny-lès-Metz, 1901–1906 (inauguration 29 July 1906)
 Artisan house in Art Nouveau style on the Märtmannstrasse in Dortmund-Aplerbeck 1902–1904
 Catholic parish Church of St. Boniface in Neuenkirchen (Oldenburg), 1902–1905 (with )
 Catholic parish Church of St. Pankratius in Buldern (with )
 Catholic parish Church of St. Lawrence in Sommerau in the Spessart, 1902 to about 1906. The reconstruction and expansion planning was not realized in favor of a new building.
 Tower of the Catholic parish Church of St. Lucia in Harsewinkel, 1903–1904 with Wilhelm Sunder-Plaßmann, Münster
 Catholic parish Church of St. Wendelin in Zellhausen (Mainhausen), 1903/04
 Catholic parish Church of St. Elizabeth in Darmstadt, 1903–1905
 Catholic parish church of St. Boniface in Giessen, 1903–1936
 Catholic Church of St. Boniface in Bad Nauheim, 1904/05
 Catholic parish Church of St. Bartholomew in Kirschhausen (Heppenheim), 1904/05
 Transept and double tower facade of the Catholic parish Church of St. Brigida in Legden, 1905
 Longhouse and double tower facade of the Catholic parish Church of St. Stephan in Mainz-Gonsenheim, 1905–1906
 Catholic parish church St. Martinus in Hattersheim am Main, 1915
 Catholic parish Church of St. Theresia in Rhens.

References

19th-century German architects
1855 births
1940 deaths
20th-century German architects
Architects from Cologne
RWTH Aachen University alumni